The western dwarf salamander (Eurycea paludicola) is species of salamander native to the southern United States.

Taxonomy 
It was described in 1947 but later synonymized with the southeastern dwarf salamander (Eurycea quadridigitata). However, a 2017 study used . In addition, genetic studies indicate that it may be more closely related to the radiation of neotenic Eurycea of the Edwards Plateau in Texas than to the rest of the E. quadridigitata complex.

Distribution 
It ranges from southern Mississippi east through Louisiana to eastern Texas.

References 
Paludicola
Endemic fauna of the United States
Amphibians of the United States
Amphibians described in 1947

Taxa named by Myron Budd Mittleman